Noyon Cathedral (Cathédrale Notre-Dame de Noyon) is a Roman Catholic church and former cathedral, located in Noyon, France. It was formerly the seat of the Bishopric of Noyon, abolished by the Concordat of 1801 and merged into the Diocese of Beauvais. The cathedral was constructed on the site of a church burned down in 1131 and is a fine example of the transition from Romanesque to Gothic architecture.

Features

In plan it is a Latin cross, with a total length from east to west of about 105 m; the height of the nave vaulting is 23 m. The west front has a porch, added in the 14th century, and two unfinished towers, their upper portions dating from the 13th century; their decorations have been greatly mutilated. The nave consists of eleven bays, including those of the west front, which, in the interior, forms a kind of transept, similar to some narthexes of English churches. The windows of the aisles, the arches of the triforium gallery, and the windows of the clerestory use round-headed arches, but double pointed arches appear in the lower gallery and in the vaults of the nave and aisles. The vaulting was originally sexpartite, but were rebuilt after a fire in 1293 in the prevailing quadripartite style. The transepts have apsidal (semicircular) terminations. Side chapels were added in the north aisle in the 14th century and in the south aisle in the 15th and the 16th centuries. One of the latter (15th) is especially rich in decorations. The flying buttresses of the building were restored in the 19th century in the style of the 12th century. From the northwest corner of the nave runs the western gallery of a fine cloister erected in 1230; and next to the cloister is the chapter house of the same date, with its entrance adorned with statues of the bishops and other sculpture.

The main interior elevation is typical for a transitional Gothic church, with four stories: aisle arcade, gallery arcade, blind triforium and clerestory. The overall elevation closely resembles that at Tournai Cathedral, with arches springing from columns. This is altered in the transepts, where there is an aisle arcade, blind triforium, and lower and upper clerestories, and the line of the respond extends all the way to the floor.

Noyon's choir was rebuilt following an 1131 fire. The arrangement of the apse, with its arc of columns, is similar to those of Saint Denis and Senlis Cathedral.

History
Noyon Cathedral is an example of a Cathedral in the Second Stage Gothic style, which developed between 1130 and 1150.  The Cathedrals construction took place before and after the change in Gothic style resulting in a transitional building. With the Choirs reconstruction after fire reaching completion in 1185, it included the new ideas of height in the Second Stage Gothic with four stories.  The main arcade, triforium, and other features of the reconstructed Choir became influential for the development of higher buildings.

A caveau phonocamptique (sound reflecting vault) was installed below the crossing of the Cathedrals arms to modify the acoustic properties of the building.  There is minimal documentation of when this vault was added but it was first mentioned in a 1838 publication.  Later, the term phonocamptique was first used in describing the vault in 1845 by antiquarian C. A. Moët de la Forte-Maison.  The vault, with limestone rib structure, has 64 clay vases mortared in place.  The origins of this idea in architecture can be seen in De architectura libri decem by Vitruvius.

The bishops' tombs within the cathedral were destroyed during the French Revolution. World War I also caused considerable damage, requiring twenty years of repair work.

Recent studies regarding Fractal patterns and French Gothic Cathedrals constructed from the 12th to 15th century proved new understanding in the design of these Cathedrals.  It was determined that not only did Noyon Cathedral and others follow Euclidean Geometry, but also Fractal Geometry and Fractal Dimensions.

References

Sources

See also
Early Gothic architecture
List of Gothic Cathedrals in Europe

External links 

   Lot picture of the city of Noyon and the cathedral
  Pictures of the Noyon Cathedral

Former cathedrals in France
Churches in Oise
Noyon